March Constitution may refer to:

 March Constitution (Austria)
 March Constitution (Poland)